Oberraden is a municipality in the district of Neuwied, in Rhineland-Palatinate, Germany.

A local government reform from 17 May 1974 united the former independent municipalities Oberraden and Niederraden forming the present Oberraden. Niederraden is not to be confused with Niederraden in the Eifel.

References

Neuwied (district)